Anna is a genus of sea snails, marine gastropod mollusks in the family Pisaniidae.

Species
According to the World Register of Marine Species (WoRMS), the following species with valid names are included within the genus Anna 
  †  Anna massena Risso, 1826 (nomen dubium)
Species brought into synonymy
 Anna assimilis (Reeve, 1846): synonym of Aplus assimilis (Reeve, 1846)
 Anna capixaba Coltro & Dornellas, 2013: synonym of Ameranna capixaba (Coltro & Dornellas, 2013)
 Anna dorbignyi (Payraudeau, 1826): synonym of Aplus dorbignyi (Payraudeau, 1826)
 Anna florida Garcia, 2008: synonym of Ameranna florida (Garcia, 2008)
 Anna goncalvesi (Coltro, 2005): synonym of Engina goncalvesi Coltro, 2005
 Anna marijkae (De Jong & Coomans, 1988): synonym of Ameranna milleri (Nowell-Usticke, 1959)
 Anna milleri (Nowell- Usticke, 1959): synonym of Ameranna milleri (Nowell-Usticke, 1959)
 Anna royalensis Watters, 2009: synonym of Ameranna royalensis (Watters, 2009)
 Anna scabra (Locard, 1886): synonym of Aplus scaber (Locard, 1891)
 Anna willemsae (De Jong & Coomans, 1988): synonym of Ameranna willemsae (De Jong & Coomans, 1988)

References

Pisaniidae
Gastropod genera